Curiini is a tribe of longhorn beetles in the subfamily Cerambycinae erected by LeConte in 1873.

Genera
BioLib lists:
 Cusiosa Micheli, 1983
 Curius Newman, 1840
 Plectromerus Haldemann, 1847

External links

Cerambycinae
Beetle tribes